Ætherverse is a table top miniature wargame designed by Jason Lauborough of Triskele Game Design Studios. It was released 2004-12-06. Jason is now supporting the game through his website titaniumspork.org. where he is working on a 2nd edition revision and a 1st edition PDF can be downloaded for free. The game is set in a sci-fi universe where the theory of multiple universes was proven to be true. Proving it set off wars across the Ætherverse by opening up new avenues of conquest.

Ætherverse distinguishes itself from other wargames in that the system does not merely provide pre-set army lists, but also includes rules that allow players to create their own armies from scratch. Because of this flexibility of the rule system Ætherverse has no official models, instead encouraging the players to use models from other systems or ones that they have custom-built.

The game has been nominated for a 2004 Origins Award in the "Best Miniature Wargame or Expansion" category (awarded at the 2005 Origins gaming convention).

The Game Itself

The game is based around the idea that, human nature being what it is, the ability for alternate worlds to contact each other would inevitably lead to conflict. 

As an example, what would be the reaction of a world where pagan Rome was still the global superpower be to a world which was ruled by the Catholic Church? With Ætherverse you can play out such battles. 

The system is based around constructing your own army, one custom tailored to suit the players tastes, in terms of play style, miniatures used, and background data. Almost any force can be represented. 

This design process breaks down to representing your army into six distinct stats, and a number of 'attributes' representing special skills or talents.
Based on these chosen abilities, your army can be equipped with various armor and weapons, along with vehicles for support. They then go and fight with someone else's army. A typical (3,000 point) army will consist of about 30 troops, with possible aerial, artillery, orbital, or vehicle support. However, armies can range in size from 3 to 300 models, so the scale of a game is often quite dependent on the army design choices of the players involved.

Ten sided dice are used as a randomizing element.

Upheaval

A smaller-scale version of Ætherverse, entitled Ætherverse: Upheaval, was created and put onto the Internet as a pay-per-download PDF file. Gameplay in Upheaval was similar to that of its predecessor, although it included a higher level of detail, which in turn led to a lower model count. A normal Upheaval army might only consist of two or three units rather than the seven to ten that were common in "standard" Ætherverse play.

External links
Ætherverse, Triskele Game Design, 2004

http://www.titaniumspork.org/ 

Miniature wargames
Wargames introduced in the 2000s